Ruth Fahrbach (born November 25, 1942) is an American politician who served in the Connecticut House of Representatives from the 61st district from 1981 to 2009.

References

1942 births
Living people
Republican Party members of the Connecticut House of Representatives